White Love may refer to:
 White Love, a 1979 romance film from Japan
 White Love (Starship Planet song), the second collaboration single by labelmates K.Will, Sistar and Boyfriend
 White Love (Speed song), a single by Japanese girl group Speed